Cliff Jacobson  is an American canoeist, author and outdoorsman. He is best known for his books on camping and canoeing.

Early life

Jacobson was born in Chicago, Illinois. He started canoeing at the age of 11, in northern Michigan. In 1962, he received his bachelor's degree in forestry from Purdue University. Later, he worked as an outfitter and canoe guide for the Science Museum of Minnesota. He is also a retired teacher of environmental science at Hastings Middle School.

Jacobson was an artillery officer (2nd and 1st. Lt.) in the U.S. army from 1963 to 1965. He was stationed in Bayreuth, Germany.

In 2003, Jacobson received the Legends Of Paddling Award from the American Canoe Association. He was awarded the Distinguished Eagle Scout Award by the Boy Scouts of America in 2009. He is a member of the Outdoor Writers Association of America.

Selected books
 Justin Cody's Race to Survival! 
 Boundary Waters Canoe Camping 
 Basic Illustrated Camping 
 Basic Illustrated Canoeing 
 Basic Illustrated Map and Compass 
 Basic Illustrated Knots for the Outdoors 
 Basic Illustrated Cooking in the Outdoors
 Basic Essentials of Trailside Shelters and Emergency Shelters ((
 Basic Essentials: Solo Canoeing ((
 Outdoor Knots
 Canoeist's Q&A
 Camping's Forgotten Skills
 The Forgotten Skills video (DVD)
 Campsite Memories, True Tales from Wild Places
 Canoeist's Little Book of Wisdom
 Water, Water Everywhere, pub. by HACH Company, Loveland CO. (A water-quality curriculum for grades 8–12).
 Canoeing & Camping beyond the basics  
 Expedition Canoeing  
 Canoeing Wild Rivers 
 Camping's Top Secrets

References

External links
 

Living people
American male canoeists
20th-century American male writers
People from Chicago
Year of birth missing (living people)
20th-century American writers